Héctor Hugo Rangel Zamarron (born 20 August 1980) is a Mexican road bicycle racer. He competed at the 2012 Summer Olympics in the Men's road race and finished 38th.

Rangel won the  2016 Tour de Tucson in a time of 4 hours 10 minutes and 47.12 seconds.

Major results
Source: 

2006
 6th Overall Vuelta a El Salvador
2011
 Vuelta a Bolivia
1st Stages 1, 3 & 5
2012
 1st Stage 1 Vuelta a Guatemala
 1st Stage 5 Vuelta Mexico Telmex
 3rd Road race, National Road Championships
 3rd Overall Ruta del Centro
 9th Time trial, Pan American Road Championships
2013
 1st Overall Tucson Bicycle Classic
1st Stage 1
 2nd Time trial, National Road Championships
 5th Overall Ruta del Centro
1st Stages 3, 4 & 5
2015
 3rd Time trial, National Road Championships

References

External links

Mexican male cyclists
1980 births
Living people
Olympic cyclists of Mexico
Cyclists at the 2012 Summer Olympics
Sportspeople from Saltillo